Rena Sherel Sofer (born December 2, 1968) is an American actress, known for her appearances in daytime television, episodic guest appearances, and made-for-television movies. In 1995, Sofer received a Daytime Emmy Award for her portrayal of Lois Cerullo in the soap opera General Hospital. From 2013 to 2022, she played the role of Quinn Fuller on the CBS soap opera The Bold and the Beautiful.

Early life 
Sofer was born in  Arcadia, California, the daughter of Susan Sofer (née Franzblau), a psychology professor, and Martin Sofer, an Orthodox rabbi.

She moved with her father and brother David to Teaneck, New Jersey, in 1970. However, when Sofer was 5 years old, they resided in Western Pennsylvania. They lived in Ambridge, Pennsylvania, where her father led Beth Samuels Jewish Center.
She later attended the Frisch School, a coeducational Modern Orthodox Jewish high school in Paramus, New Jersey. Sofer lived in North Bergen, New Jersey, where her father was rabbi of synagogue Temple Beth El. She graduated from North Bergen High School, then attended classes at Montclair State College.

Career

Daytime television
Sofer first played Lois Marie Cerullo on General Hospital.  Her first appearance was in 1993 as a band manager. However, her first high-profile role was as Rocky McKenzie on the daytime soap opera Loving (1988–91).

Sofer is perhaps best known for her role as Lois Cerullo on General Hospital (December 15, 1993 – September 24, 1996). She later returned as a guest star (February 7–17, 1997; September 30 – October 2, 1997). Her portrayal of the outrageous Lois won Sofer a Daytime Emmy Award in 1995 for Outstanding Supporting Actress in a Drama Series.

In May 2013, it was announced that Sofer would join the CBS soap opera The Bold and the Beautiful, in a newly created role of Quinn Fuller; her first episode aired on July 12. After nine years on the canvas, Sofer opted to end her run in the role of Quinn; she last aired onscreen on August 29, 2022.

Primetime television 
Sofer has appeared in several high-profile prime time television series in a guest star/supporting cast member roles: Seinfeld, Melrose Place, The Chronicle, Ed, Friends, Spin City, Blind Justice, Ghost Whisperer, 24, NCIS, and Two and a Half Men.

Sofer briefly joined the cast of the NBC sitcom Just Shoot Me!, playing the character Vicky Costa.  The network later cast Sofer in the short-lived US remake of the UK series Coupling.
In recent years, Rena Sofer has appeared in the NBC TV series Heroes as the recurring character Heidi Petrelli, wife of aspiring politician Nathan Petrelli (Adrian Pasdar). She appeared on Two and a Half Men in 2008, as a former girlfriend of the character Charlie Harper (Charlie Sheen). Rena also has guest starred on Dirty Sexy Money playing an intrepid reporter and played a ghost on Ghost Whisperer. In early 2010, Sofer began a recurring role on NCIS as Attorney Margaret Allison Hart, a potential love interest for the character Leroy Jethro Gibbs (Mark Harmon). She had a brief guest role on Bones as a love interest for the character Seeley Booth (David Boreanaz).

In 2013, Sofer had a publicized appearance on Once Upon a Time, playing Snow White's mother.

Film 
In film, she appeared as a love interest of Ben Stiller's character in the film Keeping the Faith, starring Jenna Elfman, Stiller and Edward Norton (who also directed). She also played a bride to-be with Melanie Griffith in Sidney Lumet's movie A Stranger Among Us and in Penelope Buitenhuis's movie The Secret of Hidden Lake.

She played the P.E. teacher Ms. Desjarden in the television film adaptation of Carrie in 2002. She starred in the television movie Always and Forever which aired October 24, 2009 on the Hallmark Channel. She has been doing TV movies since 1992, when she starred as Andrea Larson in the television movie Saved by the Bell: Hawaiian Style.

Personal life 
Sofer and her General Hospital co-star Wally Kurth, who played her onscreen love interest, became involved as their characters' storyline progressed. In 1995, the actors were married and had a daughter, Rosabel Rosalind Kurth. In 1997, Sofer and Kurth divorced.

Sofer married television director and producer Sanford Bookstaver in 2003. On August 5, 2005, Sofer gave birth to her second daughter, her first with Bookstaver, in Los Angeles. Sofer and Bookstaver eventually divorced in 2017. In 2019, Sofer announced they had reconciled and in April announced their engagement, and they later remarried in 2019.

Filmography

Awards and nominations

References

External links 

Living people
Actresses from California
Actresses from New Jersey
American film actresses
American soap opera actresses
American television actresses
American people of Russian-Jewish descent
Frisch School alumni
Jewish American actresses
Montclair State University alumni
People from Arcadia, California
People from North Bergen, New Jersey
North Bergen High School alumni
Daytime Emmy Award winners
Daytime Emmy Award for Outstanding Supporting Actress in a Drama Series winners
Actresses from Pittsburgh
20th-century American actresses
21st-century American actresses
21st-century American Jews
1968 births